San Marco Argentano is a town and comune in the province of Cosenza in the Calabria region of southern Italy.

Main sights include the Norman tower, several churches and the ruins of an abbey, Santa Maria della Matina.

San Marco Argentano was the birthplace of Bohemond I of Antioch (1050s births), eldest son of Robert Guiscard and christened "Mark" at his baptism.

External links
Historical records for San Marco Argentano 

Cities and towns in Calabria